Amphitrite Point Lighthouse is an active lighthouse near Uclulelet on the west coast of Vancouver Island in British Columbia, Canada, named after Amphitrite, the sea goddess and wife of Poseidon in Greek mythology. It is also known for one of the sample pictures in Windows 7.

Geography 
Amphitrite Point has the only active lighthouse in the Tofino-Ucluelet area accessible by automobile, with the only other local lighthouse being on Lennard Island, viewable only by air or boat. The Amphitrite Point Light is located at the southern end of the Ucluelet Peninsula and the north side of the Barkley Sound, approximately 3 kilometers south of downtown Ucluelet and 40 kilometers south of Tofino, British Columbia. The lighthouse tower is closed to the public but the grounds are open as part of the Lighthouse Loop section of the Wild Pacific Trail. In addition to hiking the trail to view the lighthouse, visitors can park at the end of Coast Guard Road and walk directly to the lighthouse in 2–3 minutes. Amphitrite Point, much like the rest of the Ucluelet Peninsula, is subjected to frequent winter storms and has an oceanic climate (Köppen Cfb) with approximately 3.3 metres (130 inches) of annual rainfall. The next active lighthouse to the north of Amphitrite Point Light is the Lennard Island Lighthouse off of Chesterman Beach; the next active lighthouse to the south is the Cape Beale Lightstation on the south side of Barkley Sound.

History 
The first lighthouse at this site was a small wooden tower built in 1906. This lighthouse was destroyed in bad weather in 1914, and the current concrete lighthouse opened in March 1915. Amphitrite Point is exposed to frequent gale-force winds, tidal waves and is also in a tsunami inundation zone, so the current lighthouse (built in 1915) derives its peculiar shape and construction from being designed to withstand strong westerly storms coming off the Pacific Ocean. It was staffed by Canadian Coast Guard lighthouse keepers from 1915 until 1988, when it was automated.

Oceanographic research

The Amphitrite Point Light is one of 12 lighthouses part of the British Columbia Shore Station Oceanographic Program, collecting coastal water temperature and salinity measurements everyday since 1934.  Their data show an increase in coastal water temperatures of 0.08 °C per decade. This trend is a result of anthropogenic climate change.

Climate

Gallery

See also 
 Ucluelet
 Tofino
 Pacific Rim National Park Reserve
 List of lighthouses in British Columbia
 List of lighthouses in Canada

References

External links
 Aids to Navigation Canadian Coast Guard

Lighthouses completed in 1915
Lighthouses in British Columbia
Clayoquot Sound region
Barkley Sound region
Vancouver Island